Amazing Adventures of a Nobody is a reality-travel entertainment TV series that follows Leon Logothetis, the presenter and creator, on his travels around the U.K. on just 5 pounds a day. The 5 pounds have to cover food, accommodation and travel; the 5 pounds reflecting an average hourly wage, according to the Department of Trade and Industry in the U.K. Leon had certain cities he had to pass through and was only ever allowed to stay for 24 hours in each city. The 5 pounds could not roll over and had to be spent. He was presented a new five pound note for each new day. The public could buy him things and he could work for goods, but was never allowed to be given money directly.

Before Leon had done the U.K. version, he traveled in America on $5 a day, starting in Times Square, New York and finishing at the Hollywood Sign, Los Angeles.

Amazing Adventures of a Nobody has been shown on numerous Television Channels including Sky3, Sky Travel, Life One, Extreme Sports Channel & Fox Reality Channel.

As of June 2009, a European version in which Logothetis travels from Paris, France all the way to Moscow, Russia on €5 a day was aired on Dave and was repeated on Blighty.

Adaptations
Amazing Adventures of a Nobody is the title of Leon Logothetis' non-fiction book, released 15 October 2011 on Amazon.  The book, inspired by his journeys, offers a deeper and more intimate look at Leon's personal evolution throughout his travels. Author Brad Klontz has referred to it as "More than a titillating travelogue, [the book] is a sojourn into the psyche of America."

References

External links
 
 
 First Person: 'I Travelled to Moscow on 5 Euros A Day' by Charlotte Philby, Independent, 6 June 2009

2006 British television series debuts
2009 British television series debuts
2000s British documentary television series
2000s British travel television series
Sky UK original programming
English-language television shows